Alvania annobonensis is a species of minute sea snail, a marine gastropod mollusk or micromollusk in the family Rissoidae.

Distribution
The species has been found at 8 m depth off the islet Tortuga, near the island of Annobón, Equatorial Guinea.

References

Rissoidae
Gastropods described in 2004
Invertebrates of Equatorial Guinea
Fauna of Annobón